The Acheulo-Yabrudian complex is a complex of archaeological cultures in the Levant at the end of the Lower Palaeolithic. It follows the Acheulian and precedes the Mousterian. It is also called the Mugharan Tradition or the Acheulo-Yabrudian Cultural Complex (AYCC).

The Acheulo-Yabrudian complex has three stone-tool traditions, chronologically: the Acheulo-Yabrudian, the Yabrudian and the Pre-Aurignacian or Amudian. The Yabrudian tradition is dominated by thick scrapers shaped by steep Quina retouch; the Acheuleo-Yabrudian contains Yabrudian scrapers and handaxes; and the Pre-Aurignacian/Amudian is dominated by blades and blade-tools.

Dating
Determining the age period for the Acheulo-Yabrudian has been difficult as its major excavations occurred in the 1930s and 1950s before modern radiometric dating. The recently excavated Qesem and Tabun caves, however, suggest the oldest period is about 350 kyr and the most recent 200 kyr. This would make the Lower–Middle Palaeolithic transition rapid occurring at 215,000 BP within a 30,000 year period.
Some date it earlier at 400,000-220,000 bp.

Major sites
 Yabrud I in Syria
 Tabun Cave in the Mount Carmel range, Israel
 Misliya Cave, Mount Carmel, Israel
 Zuttiyeh Cave in Wadi Amud in Israel, the location of ‘Galilee Man’
 Qesem Cave, the southernmost site yet found

See also
 Pre-history of the Southern Levant

References

Paleolithic
Archaeological cultures of the Near East